Brandon Adams is the name of:

Brandon Adams (actor) (born 1979), American actor
Brandon Adams (boxer) (born 1989), American boxer
Brandon Adams (poker player) (born 1978), American poker player